, also known by the Latin mnemonic  ("there are two"), is a letter written in 494 by Pope Gelasius I to Byzantine Emperor Anastasius I Dicorus on the relationship between religious and secular officials.

Description 

 is a letter written in 494 by Pope Gelasius I to Byzantine Emperor Anastasius I Dicorus which expressed the Gelasian doctrine. According to commentary in the Enchiridion symbolorum, the letter is "the most celebrated document of the ancient Church concerning the two powers on earth." The Gelasian doctrine articulates a Christian theology about division of authority and power. All Medieval theories about division of power between priestly spiritual authority and secular temporal authority were versions of the Gelasian doctrine. According to the Gelasian doctrine, secular temporal authority is inferior to priestly spiritual authority since a priestly spiritual authority is responsible for the eternal condition of both a secular temporal authority and the subjects of that secular temporal authority but "implies that the priestly authority is inferior to the secular authority in the secular domain."

Dualistic principle of Church and State
This letter established the dualistic principle that would underlie all Western European political thought for almost a millennium. Gelasius expressed a distinction between two principles governing the world, which Gelasius called the "sacred authority of bishops" and the "royal power".

Potestas and auctoritas

Sovereign immunity
 This doctrine remains in force in international politics, even though most absolute monarchies have been replaced by constitutional monarchies or republics.

See also
Hugh of Saint Victor (c. 1135) On the Sacraments of the Christian Faith.
Pope Boniface VIII (1302) , about two allegorical swords.
 Render unto Caesar
 Priesthood of Melchizedek
 Romans 13
 Doctrine of the two swords

Citations

References

External links 
 

Legal immunity
Religion and politics
5th-century works
490s
Documents of Pope Gelasius I